The Quaid-e-Azam International Hospital (QIH) is a private hospital in Islamabad, Rawalpindi, Pakistan. Founded in 2004 by Dr. Shaukat Ali Bangash MD, Diplomate American Board of Internal Medicine, Diplomate American Board of Infectious Diseases, Dr. Akram Bhatti, a Cardiac surgeon with Hospital in Las Vegas, NV, USA and Dr. Khalid Saleem Aslam, Orthopedic surgeon. Diplomate American Board Orthopedic Surgery, American Board Neurological and Orthopedic Surgery. Fellow American College of Surgeons, American Academy Orthopedic Surgeons, American Academy of Neurological and Orthopedic Surgery, International College Surgeons. The hospital provides a broad range of secondary and tertiary care, including diagnosis of disease and team management of patient care.

Facilities

Quaid-e-Azam International Hospital (QIH) is a project of Global Health Services, which is a public limited company registered with SECP.
The project is named after the Quaid-e-Azam Mohammad Ali Jinnah, and it was inaugurated in 2011 on 25 December, celebrating the birthday of Quaid-e-Azam Mohammad Ali Jinnah.

QIH has already started its out-patient clinics in Orthopedics, Internal Medicine, Pediatrics, Cardiology, Cardiac Surgery, Vascular Surgery, Ophthalmology, Infectious Diseases, Pulmonology, General Surgery, Urology, Nephrology with Dialysis, Dentistry, Dermatology, Endocrinology, Obstetrics / Gynecology, ENT, Plastic Surgery, Neurosurgery, Neurology, Psychology, Psychiatry, Speech and Physiotherapy. All clinics are located with their respective IPD rooms on the same floor.
Facilities of MRI, CT Scan, Gamma Camera, Fluoroscopy, Mammography, Ultrasound, CR, ETT, Echo, EKG, EEG, Angiography, Angioplasty, Knee and Hip Joint replacements, CABG (Bypass Surgery), Liver & Kidney Transplant and Cochlear Implant are available 24 Hours, 7 days a week.

All types of Lab Services including Hematology, Chemistry, Histopathology, Microbiology, Blood Bank etc., are available round the clock under the supervision of highly trained foreign qualified consultants.

References 

Hospitals in Islamabad
Rawalpindi District
Memorials to Muhammad Ali Jinnah

https://www.dawn.com/news/577444/more-women-undergo-knee-operations